The liberation of Isfahan was a direct result of the Battle of Murche-Khort in which the Persian army under Nader attacked and routed Ashraf's Afghan army. The day after Murche-Khort on November 16, 1729 Nader marched his army into Isfahan where the looting and mob violence that had gripped the city in the chaotic aftermath of Ashraf's departure ceased immediately. Order was restored with many of the Afghans hiding throughout the city being dragged through the streets and massacred without mercy in reprisals. The tomb of Mahmud Hotaki was also another target of the mob's rage, being demolished and later becoming home to a public toilet.

Tahmasp II regains the Safavid capital 
On December 9, 1729 Nader awaited outside the city gates for the Shah's arrival. Tahmasp II was received in a ceremony in which as soon as he reached Nader's person he "dismounted from his horse in a show of respect whence Nader did likewise rushing forth to dissuade the Shah from his magnanimous deed, however the Shah insisted they walk together and expressed an inability to reward Nader's ceaseless service to him. After a few more minutes of polite conversation the Shah remounted his steed and led the way back into the city with Nader following close behind".

The Shah's return was greeted with much jubilation from the citizens of Isfahan. Tahmasp however was reduced to tears when he witnessed the destitution and abject condition of the once glorious capital of a mighty empire.

See also 
Battle of Damghan (1729)
Battle of Murche-Khort
Safavid dynasty

Battles involving Safavid Iran
Conflicts in 1729
Isfahan
1729 in Iran
Campaigns of Nader Shah